The 1946 Trinity Tigers football team was an American football team that represented Trinity University of Texas as an independent during the 1946 college football season. In their first season under head coach Bob Coe, the team compiled a 6–2 record, shut out four of eight opponents, and outscored all opponents by a total of 305 to 47. 

Trinity ranked third nationally in total offense among small-college teams with an average of 387.0 yards per game. It also ranked second in total defense, giving up only 100.8 yards per game.

The season was the first for the football team after the school's move from Waxahachie to San Antonio. It also marked a transition for Trinity as it prepared to join the Lone Star Conference during the 1947 season. The 1946 season consisted of games primarily with Army teams from in and around San Antonio and was billed by the school as "the start of bigger things to come for San Antonio sport fans."

The team did not yet have a football stadium on its San Antonio campus and played its home games at Alamo Stadium and Harlandale High School field, both in San Antonio.

Schedule

Players
 Clay Browne, center, 180 pounds
 Ernest Denham, end, 190 pounds
 Robert Erfurth, halfback, 155 pounds
 Daniel Forbes, tackle, 190 pounds
 H. Hieronymous, quarterback, 170 pounds
 Gerald Keller, fullback, 181 pounds
 John Mack, tackle, 210 pounds
 Ike Meador, end, 195 pounds
 Henry Perry, halfback, 155 pounds
 Jerry Simmang, guard, 185 pounds
 Norman Theis, guard, 170 pounds

References

Trinity
Trinity Tigers football seasons
Trinity Football